Benoît François Dominique Schwarz (born 19 August 1991) is a Swiss curler. He currently throws fourth stones for the Peter de Cruz rink. He won gold medal with the Swiss team at the 2013 European Curling Championships in Stavanger and a bronze medal at the 2014 World Men's Curling Championship in Beijing. He competed at the 2012 and 2013 World Curling Championships, and at the 2014 Winter Olympics in Sochi as an alternate.  In 2017, he earned a bronze medal at the 2017 World Men's Curling Championship in Edmonton, Canada. He was the team member of Swiss Curling team in 2018 Winter Olympics.

Personal life
As of 2020, Schwarz was a business administration student. He lives in Zürich.

References

External links

1991 births
Living people
Curlers at the 2014 Winter Olympics
Curlers at the 2018 Winter Olympics
Swiss male curlers
Olympic curlers of Switzerland
Sportspeople from Geneva
Sportspeople from Zürich
European curling champions
Continental Cup of Curling participants
Olympic bronze medalists for Switzerland
Medalists at the 2018 Winter Olympics
Olympic medalists in curling
Curlers at the 2022 Winter Olympics
21st-century Swiss people